In the Royal Navy, a principal naval transport officer (P.N.T.O.) later known as principal sea transport officer (P.S.T.O.)  is a shore-based flag officer or captain responsible for sea transport duties, and assisting the senior naval officer's area of command in the preparation of naval orders and conduct disembarkations. British Dominion Navies also used the concept.

History
Principal Transport Officers of the Royal Navy had been in existence from at least 1868. The Naval Transports Service was created by the Royal Navy on 22 December 1914. From 1915 to 1916 the Eastern Mediterranean Squadron had a principal naval transport officer based at Mudros who held the rank of commodore. The officers were employed as part of the Naval Transport Service as part of the Department of the Director of Transports. In 1921 the Naval Transport Service was restyled as the Sea Transport Service. of the Sea Transport Department. Naval officers were assigned to postings at various ports and naval bases through to 1970.

Locations of principal naval transport officers

Locations of principal sea transport officers

See also 
 Divisional transport officer

References 

Nautical terminology
Royal Navy appointments